Xia Lina (born October 26, 1987 in Harbin) is a Chinese female alpine ski racer.

She competed for China at the 2010 Winter Olympics in the Slalom and Giant Slalom events.  She then competed in the 2014 Winter Olympics in Sochi where she finished 66th in the Giant Slalom.

References

1987 births
Living people
Chinese female alpine skiers
Olympic alpine skiers of China
Alpine skiers at the 2010 Winter Olympics
Alpine skiers at the 2014 Winter Olympics
Alpine skiers at the 2007 Asian Winter Games
Skiers from Harbin
21st-century Chinese women